The Angkor Wat Marathons are the annual marathons held in Angkor, Cambodia. There are two marathons from Angkor recognised by the Association of International Marathons and Road Races namely Angkor Wat International Half Marathon and Angkor Empire Marathon. Angkor Wat International Half marathon has been held annually since 1996. Angkor Empire Marathon is the first full marathon from Cambodia held since 2014. The event is organized by National Olympic Committee of Cambodia (NOCC). According to its official website, the purpose of the event is to "support a ban on the manufacture and inhumane use of antipersonnel mines".

Angkor Wat International Half Marathon

The Angkor Wat International Half Marathon was first organized in 1996 by Yuko Arimori, the first Japanese woman to win a marathon medal in the Olympics. The motto of the marathon is "Building a better future. Aid for the children and disabled in Cambodia". It is organized by National Olympic Committee of Cambodia, Association of Athletics Federations Cambodia and Cambodian Events Organizer Co. Ltd. The marathon is recognized by Association of International Marathons and Road Races and the Association of Athletics Federations Cambodia (Khmer AAF). It is supported by the government of Cambodia, the Embassy of Japan in Cambodia, the United Nations Population Fund, and several other organizations.

The first edition of the International Half Marathon in 1996 saw just 654 participants from 14 countries. Since then participation in the event has steadily increased. In the 2014 event, nearly 8,000 runners from 78 countries participated. The 2019 edition will be held in December.

List of winners
Key:

Angkor Empire Marathon

The full length marathon was introduced in 2014. It is the first full marathon (42 km) in Cambodia, and is organized and supported by same agencies as the half marathon. Over 2000 participants from 48 countries participated in the 2015 edition of marathon. Angkor Hospital for Children, Kantha Bopha Children’s Hospital, and the Cambodian Red Cross are beneficiaries of the Angkor Empire Marathon. Neko Hiroshi, a Japanese native and naturalized Cambodian citizen, was the first winner of Empire marathon in 2014, while Japanese runner Koki Kawauchi was the winner of the 2015 edition. Sakie Ishiba Shi, also of Japan, won the women's full marathon in 2015. The 2015 edition held in August saw around 2,200 participants.

List of winners
Key:

Course of Marathon

The Marathon starts and ends at the Angkor Wat temple complex, a World Heritage Site. Other important spots over course of run are the Angkor Archaeological Park, Preah Prom Rath pagoda, and several other temples.

References

Sport in Cambodia
Cambodia–Japan relations
Marathons in Cambodia